Alexia Laurette Walker (born 26 November 1982) is an English former cricketer who played as an all-rounder. She was a right-handed batter and right-arm fast-medium bowler. She appeared in three One Day Internationals for England in August 2001, making her debut against Scotland. In total she took one wicket and scored 14 runs. She played domestic cricket for Sussex from 1998 to 2015.

In June 2009 Walker was appointed as the cricket director at Brighton College, a co-educational private school in Brighton. She is the first woman cricket director at an English private school. Previously she was cricket performance manager at Loughborough University.

In January 2010 Walker became one of only three women to pass the ECB Level 4 Coaching Certificate and was believed to be the youngest candidate of either sex to gain the award.

References

External links
 
 

1982 births
Living people
Sportspeople from East Sussex
England women One Day International cricketers
Sussex women cricketers